Hydrogenibacillus schlegelii is a Gram-positive species of bacteria. Strains of this species were originally isolated from a lake (Le Loclat) near St-Blaise, Neuchâtel, Switzerland. The species is thermophilic; strains isolated from soil in Antarctica were found to grow at temperatures between 59 and 72 °C.

See also
 List of bacterial orders
 List of bacteria genera

References

External links 
Type strain of Hydrogenibacillus schlegelii at BacDive -  the Bacterial Diversity Metadatabase

Bacillota
Bacteria described in 1981